Keep Your Seats, Please is a 1936 British comedy film directed by Monty Banks and starring George Formby, Florence Desmond and Alastair Sim. It marked the film debut of the child star Binkie Stuart. The film was made by Associated Talking Pictures.

The film follows a farcical plot based on the 1928 Russian satirical novel The Twelve Chairs by Ilya Ilf and Yevgeni Petrov. The film features Formby's signature tune, "When I'm Cleaning Windows".

Plot
George Withers  learns he is supposed to inherit some valuable jewels from his aunt, and enlists the aid of his dubious lawyer to ensure he gets them. It transpires the stones are hidden in the lining of one of six antique chairs, and his aunt has left instructions for her nephew to purchase the chairs at auction. But unfortunately they are sold separately, as he arrives too late to bid.

Cast
 George Formby as George Withers  
 Florence Desmond as Florrie  
 Gus McNaughton as Max  
 Alastair Sim as A. S. Drayton 
 Harry Tate as Auctioneer  
 Enid Stamp-Taylor as Madame Louise  
 Hal Gordon as Sailor  
 Tom Payne as Man from Child Welfare  
 Beatrix Fielden-Kaye as Woman from Child Welfare  
 Clifford Heatherley as Doctor Wilberforce 
 Binkie Stuart as Binkie  
 May Whitty as  Aunt Georgina Withers  
 Harvey Braban as Detective Jones
 Ethel Coleridge as Spinster 
 Syd Crossley as Bus Conductor 
 Maud Gill as Fanny Tidmarsh 
 Jimmy Godden as X-Ray Doctor 
 Mike Johnson as Mr. O'Flaherty 
 Margaret Moffatt as Mrs. O'Flaherty 
 Frank Perfitt as Bus Inspector

Critical references
Sky Movies wrote, "Formby's on form - especially singing 'Keep Your Seats, Please' and 'When I'm Cleaning Windows' - Florence Desmond's a much stronger leading lady that George usually had, and Alastair Sim made one of his first major impacts in films as the unscrupulous lawyer who also has his beady eye on the hidden fortune".

References

Bibliography
 Low, Rachael. Filmmaking in 1930s Britain. George Allen & Unwin, 1985.
 Perry, George. Forever Ealing. Pavilion Books, 1994.
 Wood, Linda. British Films, 1927-1939. British Film Institute, 1986.

External links

1936 films
British comedy films
1930s English-language films
Films directed by Monty Banks
1936 comedy films
Associated Talking Pictures
Films set in England
Films based on Russian novels
Ilf and Petrov
British black-and-white films
1930s British films